FC Steaua București, often known in English as Steaua Bucharest, is a highly successful Romanian professional football club. Amongst its successes are 20 domestic league titles, winning the Romanian Cup 20 times, defeating FC Barcelona in the final to take the 1985–86 European Cup and winning the 1986 UEFA Super Cup against Dynamo Kyiv.

The team was founded in 1947 as the football arm of the army's sports club CSA Steaua București, owned by the Ministry of National Defence. In 1998, with mounting pressure by the then Minister of National Defence, Victor Babiuc, as well as the media and Romania's governing football bodies, LPF and FRF, regarding an alleged directive from UEFA which claimed to ban any state owned teams from its international competitions, CSA Steaua București closed its football arm. A new non-profit organization (AFC Steaua București) was created in a post-Ceaușescu privatization scheme which was handed over the right to use the Steaua brand name and the Steaua Stadium, while CSA Steaua București retained ownership of both and the tutelage over the new entity. Alongside the name and the stadium, the new club claimed Steaua's place in the Romanian first division, while the entire football staff and roster were also transferred, at no cost, to the new organization. In 2000, on the upswing of eliminating state owned teams from ever participating in the first football tier, an article was added to the National Sports Law to help this matter. It was only two decades later when journalists finally decided to question the alleged UEFA directive and it became clear that it was all a case of fake news.

By 2003, a new controversial figure, Gigi Becali, had started making headlines for the past few years as the main financier of AFC Steaua București, the year in which he merged the non-profit organization into a newly formed corporation, Fotbal Club Steaua București SA. The transfer took place midway through the 2002-2003 first tier championship.

In 2011, although Becali's team was still playing on its Steaua Stadium, CSA Steaua București sued it for registering a separate Steaua brand name without its approval back in 2004 and that AFC Steaua București did not have the right to pass on the brand name nor the legacy of the original football club. By the end of 2014, Romania's Supreme Court ruled against Becali, and by 2017 he had to change its name to Fotbal Club FCSB SA.

After the 2017 ruling that forced Becali's club to rename itself FC FCSB, CSA Steaua București reestablished its football section and entered it in the fourth tier of the national championship. It currently plays in the second tier from where it cannot promote due to the National Sports Law passed in 2000.

UEFA and the Romanian Football governing bodies have stated that they view FCSB as the owner of the original club's legacy, but a trial started in 2017 to decide which entity can claim the historic legacy and all club honours is awaiting a final ruling in 2023.

References

Football clubs in Romania